Trapania toddi is a species of sea slug, a dorid nudibranch, a marine gastropod mollusc in the family Goniodorididae.

Distribution
This species was described from Loo Fu Fon, Tolo Channel, Hong Kong. The original description also includes a single specimen from Suakin, Sudan, Red Sea. It has also been reported from Heron Island (Queensland), Australia; Japan and Korea.

Description
The body of this goniodorid nudibranch is white with brown or black patches containing white spots. The rhinophores, gills, oral tentacles, lateral papillae and tail are predominantly white with yellow patches below the tips. There is also a black or brown band on the front of the rhinophore, below the yellow patch.

Ecology
Trapania toddi feeds on Entoprocta which often grow on sponges and other living substrata.

References

External links
 

Goniodorididae
Gastropods described in 1987